Alesia Graf (born Alesia Klimovich; 14 October 1980) is a Belarusian-born German professional boxer who held the WIBF super-flyweight title from 2008 to 2009. She has also challenged for the WBC female super-flyweight title twice between 2010 and 2014; the WBC female bantamweight title twice between 2014 and 2017; and the WBO female junior-featherweight title in 2019.

Graf has been boxing since 2001. She trained with Heinz Schultz in Stuttgart and with Thorsten Schmitz in Hamburg. Her professional debut was on February 14, 2004. In May 2005, she suffered her first and only defeat against Jamaican Alicia Ashley. She is under contract with Universum Box-Promotion.

Personal life 
She was separated from her mother and sister when she was 6 and united with them in 2014.

References

External links
 

1980 births
Living people
Sportspeople from Gomel
Sportspeople from Stuttgart
Belarusian emigrants to Germany
German women boxers
Belarusian women boxers
German people of Belarusian descent
Super-flyweight boxers
Bantamweight boxers
Super-bantamweight boxers